Tigrioides pallidicosta is a moth in the family Erebidae. It was described by Schaus in 1922.

References

Natural History Museum Lepidoptera generic names catalog

Moths described in 1922
Lithosiina